The  is a Japanese hand-held pellet drum, used in Shinto-Buddhist ceremonies, etc.

It has two heads and is suspended on a rod, with beads or pellets hanging on threads on either sides of the body of the drum. The drum sounds when it is turned on its axis from side to side, causing the beads to strike the heads of the drum. It is similar to the Chinese pellet drum.

See also
 Damaru

References

Japanese musical instruments
Bells (percussion)
Asian percussion instruments
Shaken membranophones
Traditional toys
Toy instruments and noisemakers